Mani Bhadara Sharma is a Nepali politician of Nepali Congress and Minister in Gandaki government since 23 July 2021. He is also serving as member of the Gandaki Province Provincial Assembly. Sharma was elected to the 2017 provincial assembly elections from the proportional list. He joined Krishna Chandra Nepali cabinet as Minister for Tourism, Industry, Commerce and Supplies on 23 July 2021.

References 

21st-century Nepalese politicians
Nepali Congress politicians from Gandaki Province
Year of birth missing (living people)
Living people

Provincial cabinet ministers of Nepal
Members of the Provincial Assembly of Gandaki Province